The McPherson Globe Refiners were an amateur basketball team in the 1930s. The Refiners contributed six members to the 1936 United States men's Olympic basketball team, the first team to win the Olympic gold medal.

History 
Due to an oil discovery in McPherson County, Kansas, in the late 1920s, Lario Oil & Gas Company had its subsidiary, the Globe Oil & Refining Company, constructed an oil refinery in McPherson. The refinery was built in 1933, and soon was producing 200,000 gallons of gasoline per day. This output necessitated a marketing campaign to promote the growing retail gasoline business.  Lario, like many in the early radio days and before television, sponsored AAU (Amateur Athletic Union) basketball teams to generate excitement for their product in the sport sections of widely read newspapers.  For a small sponsorship fee, Lario Oil & Gas was able to reach many more consumers than by conventional advertising.

1933–34 season 
In its first year, the Globe Refinery started modestly with town team basketball drawn from the community, population 5,000. The Globe Refiners found success against other town teams from the surrounding area, and got a measure of themselves with stiffer competition in the form of AAU affiliated teams. The AAU teams offered players a steady depression-era job, and the opportunity for those who had used up college eligibility to continue to improve their game skills. The AAU teams also allowed individuals to retain their amateur status.  The Refiners entered the 1934 AAU National Tournament where they were bounced out in an early round.

1934–35 season 
Enter Gene Johnson, a fiery and innovative AAU coach to make his sales pitch to Lario management.  For an outlay of $1,500, Johnson promised to recruit, train, and coach the Globe Refinery team to national success.  Lario would get outstanding publicity and marketing value, and Johnson would get back to his native Kansas, where he earlier found success coaching at Wichita (State) University.

Johnson gathered top talent in the form of Joe Fortenberry as well as several players Johnson coached as Wichita Shockers.  Fortenberry had leaping ability, and ran the court well for a 6'8" center.  Johnson had another coach-on-the-floor, as his brother Francis directed both the zone pressure and fast break attacks. The attacking play upset many basketball traditions, which in the sport's first 40 years, was a slow and methodical game.  The McPherson Globe Refiners were criticized for playing "bad" basketball with its fast and aggressive style.  But in the tough AAU Missouri Valley League, the McPherson Globe Refiners won outright against more noteworthy rivals from Denver and Kansas City.

The Globe Refiners carried this success to a second place finish in the 1935 AAU National Tournament.

1935–36 season 
The Globe Refiners season started with high hopes, and by August 1936, a farm boy from McPherson County Kansas, Bill Wheatley, accepted the first Olympic gold medal from another Kansan, Dr. James Naismith.  The McPherson Globe Refiners played a national schedule with barnstorming road trips to Louisiana, Washington, DC, and Madison Square Garden in New York City.  Along the way to a 40 win, 6 loss year, the Refiners won the AAU Missouri Valley League for a second year running.

By mid-March, the McPherson Globe Refiners were the favorites in the AAU National, contested in Denver's City Auditorium. Naismith presided over the opening ceremonies, delivering his take on the game he invented some 45 years earlier to the 500 competitors divided among 54 teams.  Before sold out crowds, the Refiners won matches in the opening rounds knowing that getting to the AAU Final meant entry into the US Olympic tryouts, and the chance to make the 1936 US basketball team. The Globe Refiners triumphed in the AAU semi final over the Kansas City Trailers securing their tryouts berth, then beat the Universal Pictures Universals 47 to 35 in the 1936 AAU Final.

1936 US Olympic tryouts 
Since basketball first became an Olympic medal sport in 1936, a new and national playoff system was developed for the US basketball team selection.  The amateur ruling bodies devised a 10 regional district playoff system for college and university entrants, which later evolved into the March Madness of the NCAA's Final Four.   Joining Universal Pictures and the McPherson team in Madison Square Garden were the five colleges advancing from the district playoffs:

 University of Arkansas
 DePaul
 Temple
 Utah State
 University of Washington

As winner of the YMCA National, the Wilmerding (PA) YMCA team earned the eighth and last slot. The quarter final winners were McPherson outscoring Temple, Universal Pictures over Arkansas, Washington beating DePaul, and the YMCA team besting Utah State.  The semi final games were important because the US Olympic team would be chosen from those two winners.  In the opener, the Universal movie men from California beat Wilmerding by 13, 42–29.  The Globe Refiners qualified by out-running Washington 48 to 30.  In an all AAU and extremely close final, Universal Pictures prevailed 44–43 over McPherson.

The 1936 United States Olympic Basketball team were an assembly of seven Universal Pictures Universals, six McPherson Globe Refiners, and one Huskie from Washington's third place team.  On the strength of his team's tryout victory, Jimmy Needles became the head coach of the first United States men's Olympic basketball team, with Gene Johnson serving as his assistant.

Notable players 

Joe Fortenberry
Francis Johnson
Jack Ragland
Bill Wheatley
Tex Gibbons
Willard Schmidt
 Vernon Vaughn

McPherson Globe Refiners legacy 

Developed the full court, zone pressure defense
Naismith Memorial Basketball Hall of Fame coach Ralph Miller in 1980 stated: "Louisville still uses the 2–2–1 zone press today almost exactly as Gene Johnson designed it."
Used the fast break to speed up basketball's pace
Gene Johnson explained: "We pushed the ball up the court and forced the game into bad basketball, and we played bad basketball better than anybody."
Dunked the ball to intimidate the opposition
Pulitzer winning sportswriter Arthur Daley after watching the McPherson Refiners dunk: "They ... pitched the ball downward into the hoop, much like a cafeteria customer dunking a roll in coffee."
Time magazine identified the McPherson's Globe Refiners as the "oddest basketballers" and "athletic freaks" who have "perfected a technique called 'dunking' with which they score by jumping up above the basket, dropping the ball into it."
During the 1936 tournaments (Denver, New York, Berlin), they met basketball's inventor, James Naismith.
Started the United States dominance in Olympic basketball by winning the first gold medal.

References  

Amateur Athletic Union
Basketball in Kansas
1936 Summer Olympics